Barnhart is a census-designated place (CDP) in Jefferson County, Missouri, United States, and is a suburb of St. Louis. The population was 5,832, at the 2020 United States Census.

Geography
Barnhart is located at  (38.337914, -90.403822).

Demographics

2010 census
As of the census of 2010, there were 5,682 people, 1,920 households, and 1,576 families living in the CDP. The racial makeup of the CDP was 97.4% White, 0.5% African American, 0.3% Native American, 0.4% Asian, 0.3% from other races, and 1.1% from two or more races. Hispanic or Latino of any race were 2.1% of the population.

There were 1,920 households, of which 44.0% had children under the age of 18 living with them, 65.3% were married couples living together, 10.8% had a female householder with no husband present, 6.0% had a male householder with no wife present, and 17.9% were non-families. 12.6% of all households were made up of individuals, and 2.7% had someone living alone who was 65 years of age or older. The average household size was 2.93 and the average family size was 3.17.

The median age in the CDP was 34.5 years. 27.6% of residents were under the age of 18; 8.1% were between the ages of 18 and 24; 28.8% were from 25 to 44; 28.5% were from 45 to 64; and 6.9% were 65 years of age or older. The gender makeup of the CDP was 50.4% male and 49.6% female.

2000 census
As of the census of 2000, there were 6,108 people, 1,962 households, and 1,663 families living in the CDP. The racial makeup of the CDP was 97.82% White, 0.36% African American, 0.13% Native American, 0.38% Asian, 0.02% Pacific Islander, 0.34% from other races, and 0.95% from two or more races. Hispanic or Latino of any race were 1.47% of the population.

There were 1,962 households, out of which 48.8% had children under the age of 18 living with them, 70.8% were married couples living together, 9.1% had a female householder with no husband present, and 15.2% were non-families. 11.2% of all households were made up of individuals, and 2.1% had someone living alone who was 65 years of age or older. The average household size was 3.08 and the average family size was 3.31.

In the CDP, the population was spread out, with 30.9% under the age of 18, 8.8% from 18 to 24, 34.4% from 25 to 44, 20.8% from 45 to 64, and 5.1% who were 65 years of age or older. The median age was 32 years. For every 100 females, there were 103.7 males. For every 100 females age 18 and over, there were 100.0 males.

The median income for a household in the CDP was $56,559, and the median income for a family was $59,189. Males had a median income of $41,758 versus $28,630 for females. The per capita income for the CDP was $20,940. About 0.9% of families and 2.6% of the population were below the poverty line, including none of those under age 18 and 6.5% of those age 65 or over.

History

Two miles south of Imperial on "El Camino Real" is Barnhart, Missouri. Many early settlers with names such as Moss, Stites, and Harris lived in this locale, but the town was not named until after the Frisco Railroad was completed in the early 1900s. It is said that because Mrs. C. L. Barnhart donated some land for the Frisco Railroad Depot, the town was named for the Barnhart family.

However, the land surrounding Barnhart had originally belonged to the O'Fallons. In 1834 Major Benjamin O'Fallon, nephew of Governor William Clark, settled here with his family. Major O'Fallon, who had lived with the Indians for many years, was later appointed Indian agent for the entire Northwest Region, a post he held for about 30 years. "O'Fallon's Bluff" on the Platte River was named for him.

Major B. O'Fallon died in 1842 leaving two sons, Colonel John and James O'Fallon. While James did not leave much history except that he was a farmer and stock raiser, his brother, John, made history as the largest taxpayer of Jefferson County, owning 20,000 acres in 1875, 3,000 at "Indian Retreat" near Sulphur Springs where he made his home.

The "James O'Fallon Home" built in 1860 still stands on Marriott Lane. The house is a two-story, 13-room brick structure with numerous gables and four dormer windows. It was purchased in 1884 by Joseph G. Marriott, and after that date was known as the Marriott Homestead.  The home is often referred to as the Parkton Mansion by current residents. Marriott owned 632 acres of land on this site and as a cattle raiser is remembered for introducing the first Holstein cattle in Jefferson County.

Education
Most of the Barnhart CDP is in the Windsor C-1 School District, while a portion of the CDP is in the Fox C-6 School District. A southwestern portion of the wider Barnhart area is assigned to the Dunklin R-V School District.

The Windsor district previously ended at the eighth grade. High school students would attend Crystal City High School or Herculaneum High School. The Fox district was originally a K-8 school district, with high school students also having a choice of Crystal City High and Herculaneum High. The Fox district became K-12 when Fox High School was established in 1955.

Barnhart has a public library, a branch of the Jefferson County Library.

References

Census-designated places in Jefferson County, Missouri
Census-designated places in Missouri
Missouri populated places on the Mississippi River